Ed Meierkort (born March 24, 1959) is an American football coach.  He served as the head football coach at the University of Wisconsin–Stout from 1993 to 2003 and University of South Dakota from 2004 to 2011, compiling a career college football coaching record of 108–89.

Career
Meierkort began his coaching career at Dakota Wesleyan, where he also served as head baseball coach. From there he served as a graduate assistant at South Dakota State before moving on to Southwest Minnesota State University, where he held various positions from 1983 to 1992.

He began his head football coaching career at the University of Wisconsin–Stout in 1993. During his tenure there, he coached 16 All-Americans and two future NFL players. In 2000, the team achieved a #5 national ranking. That year, Meierkort was named Wisconsin Intercollegiate Athletic Conference and AFCA Region 5 Coach of the Year and was a finalist for AFCA National Coach of the Year.

Meierkort was named head coach of the Coyotes of the University of South Dakota in 2004. He has overseen the program's elevation from the NCAA Division II level to Football Championship Subdivision (FCS). The team's first victory against a Division I opponent came against the Southern Utah Thunderbirds of the on November 15, 2008. In 2010, the program achieved its first win against an NCAA Division I Football Bowl Subdivision (FBS) opponent with a victory over the Minnesota Golden Gophers.

South Dakota fired Meierkort following the 2011 season. He took over the football program at Celebration High School in Celebration, Florida, for one year, but was fired after a disappointing 2012 season, during which the team went winless.

Education and family
A native of Chicago, Illinois, Meierkort is a graduate of South Dakota State University and Dakota Wesleyan University. He is married with two children.

Head coaching record

Football

References

1959 births
Living people
Dakota Wesleyan Tigers baseball coaches
Dakota Wesleyan Tigers football coaches
South Dakota Coyotes football coaches
South Dakota State Jackrabbits football coaches
Southwest Minnesota State Mustangs football coaches
Wisconsin–Stout Blue Devils football coaches
Dakota Wesleyan University alumni
South Dakota State University alumni
Sportspeople from Chicago